Tuza Maza Breakup is a Marathi language television drama series. It starred Ketaki Chitale and Sainkeet Kamat in lead roles. The series premiered on Zee Marathi by replacing Khulta Kali Khulena.

Cast

Main 
 Ketaki Chitale as Meera Sameer Desai
 Sainkeet Kamat as Sameer Sharad Desai

Recurring 
Sameer's family
 Uday Tikekar as Sharad Desai 
 Radhika Harshe as Lata Sharad Desai
 Rohini Hattangadi as Sameer's grandmother
 Mohiniraj Gatne as Sameer's uncle
 Sanyogita Bhave as Sameer's aunt

Meera's family
 Vijay Nikam as Mangesh Rane
 Rekha Badhe as Bharati Mangesh Rane
 Neeta Pendse as Meera's mother
 Shivraj Walvekar as Meera's father
 Reshma Ramchandra as Madhura Rane
 Mohit Gokhale as Meera's brother

Others
 Umesh Jagtap as Satyawan Arnalkar
 Sanjeevani Patil as Pradhan Baai
 Maadhav Deochake as Rajneesh Pradhan
 Meera Joshi as Menaka Agarwal
 Ujjwala Jog as Wagale Baai
 Ashutosh Gokhale as Sameer's friend

Reception

Special episode (1 hour) 
 26 November 2017

Ratings

References

External links 
 
 Tuza Maza Breakup at ZEE5

Marathi-language television shows
2017 Indian television series debuts
Zee Marathi original programming
2018 Indian television series endings